The FLORIDA Airspace Monitoring And Management System was an airspace monitoring and management system of the Swiss Air Force. It was built by Hughes Aircraft Company. It is located in Fullerton, California.

History

The system was put into operation in about 1970, replacing the previous SRF Airspace monitoring and management system. With the FLORIDA manufacturer continuous 24-hour/365-day air surveillance was possible. In contrast to the SRF system, the FLORIDA system was already partially automated; it could identify radar data mostly by itself, and was able to calculate interception lines to a specific radar track. 

The construction work, especially at Mount Pilatus, were widely visible to tourists. 

The system's radar antennas enhance the prediction of meteorological conditions (strong winds and lightning) and military attacks. 

The system by 2001 reached its end of its life. Requirements after 9/11 increased and the system's capacity of around 400 simultaneous objects could not keep up with increasing air traffic. The FLORIDA system was replaced in 2003 by FLORAKO.

Technology

The FLORIDA system included three main components:

Radar antennas 
The four, elevated rotating radar antennas each consisted of a primary radar, and a secondary radar mounted over the primary radar. They could be fully retracted into the mountain peak which was automatically closed with a massive door. The sites were equipped with AAA in rotatable domes for self-defense.

Operational centers 
Several wartime operational centers were located in mountain caverns. The operations center for peacetime use was sited at Dübendorf, adjacent to the surveillance squadron building. It is now used by the civilian Skyguide as a test center. The consoles were equipped with a trackball and allowed to edit each radar track quickly, when the system could not identify it. Each console had several displays showing the best interception path (the path was shown in several numbers who stood for height, speed,..) for the allocated intercept aircraft flying under the control of the tactical fighter controller (TFC) on this console. The TFC transmit by radio to the Aircraft by using the Bambini-Code (used in World War II by the Swiss Air Force-developed tactical code). Each operations center was equipped with a large status board which indicated the most important information of all the military airfields.

Computing center 
The computer center consists primarily of the computing system with the corresponding peripheral devices (magnet tape, printer, punch cards and paper tape) and interface devices (interfaces) for communication with the local (on-screen consoles, status board, etc.) and external subsystems (redundant computing centers, radar stations, Bl-64 positions, direction finders, eg.). The computer can process data from up to 400 aircraft simultaneously.

Tasks 

Formation of an adjusted, identified overall air situation based on the local air situation. Continuous updating
Data communication across all integrated FLORIDA systems and with internal and external subsystems
Provision of data to show the air situation on the consoles, and state of force readiness on the status board
Computation of solutions for use of fighter aircraft, or missiles to attack an enemy aircraft at the request of the operator (air defense)
Calculation and presentation of data management continuously updated according to the selected operating procedures 
Maintenance of operational software and the ability to test software and simulate selective air situations for personnel training (Swiss soldiers usually serve 2–4 weeks every year).

Gallery

A FLORIDA radar antenna, statusboard, 2 consoles and a complete computer center are today in the Flieger-Flab-Museum at Dübendorf.

See also 
 LGR-1 Radar
 SRF Airspace monitoring and management system
 Target allocation radar TPS-1E
 TAFLIR
 FLORAKO
 Military of Switzerland

References

External links 

Flieger-Flab-Museum Dübendorf
 Alber Wüst: Die Schweizerische Fliegerabwehr.  2011, 
 Uno Zero Zero – Ein Jahrhundert Schweizer Luftwaffe. Aeropublications, Teufen/ZH 2013, 
 Louis Geiger, Franz Betschon| Erinnerungen an die Armee 61. Huber Frauenfeld 2014, 
 Neue Zürcher Zeitung: Hubacher und der Maulwurf
Flinte, das Internet der Luftwaffe. Allgemeine schweizerische Militärzeitschrift ASMZ, Heft 6, Band 163, 1997
 Militärische Denkmäler im Bereich der Luftwaffe (PDF)(German only)
 Übersicht Radarsysteme der Schweizer Luftfahrt(German only)
 Florida Radar System bei 5:35 auf YouTube  (German only)
The Florida Radar System  at 4:20 on YouTube (German only) 
 The Aerospace Year Book, Volume 48 American Aviation Publications., 1970
Jane's Weapon Systems  F. Watts, 1987
Jane's C3I Systems Jane's Information Group, 1990

Swiss Air Force
Military of Switzerland
Ground radars
Radar networks